The Balygychan is a river in Magadan Oblast, Russian Far East.

The river freezes in October and stays frozen until the end of May. Graylings, longnose suckers, pikes and whitefish are common in the Balygychan waters.

Course 
The river has its source in the Hal-Urekchen, at the confluence of the Left Balygychan and Right Balygychan rivers of the Kolyma Mountains. It flows roughly northwards along the western flank of the Omsukchan Range. In its middle course there is the abandoned town of Verkhny Balygychan ("Upper Balygychan"). North of the town the Balygychan flows along a marshy intermontane basin where the river widens, meanders and divides in arms. Finally it joins the right bank of the Kolyma  from its mouth.  

The main tributaries of the Balygychan are the Kyrchan and the Dzhagyn, both joining it from the right. The town of Balygychan lies on the right bank of the Kolyma, just a little upstream from the confluence. There are more than 300 lakes in the basin of the river.

See also
List of rivers of Russia

References

External links
Water (in Russian)
Kolyma - Modern Guidebook to Magadan Oblast 
Rivers of Magadan Oblast
Kolyma Mountains